The AOD (automatic overdrive) is a four-speed automatic transmission, with the 4th gear as overdrive.  Introduced in 1980, it was Ford's first four-speed automatic overdrive transmission.  The gearset design is based on the Ford "X" automatic transmissions used during the 1950s, '60s, and '70s.  The AOD replaced many of Ford's older transmissions such as the C4, C5, and light duty applications of the FMX.

History
In 1962 Ford began working on a new type of automatic transmission that would emphasize fuel economy and driveability. The new transmission was built around the Ravigneaux planetary gearset of the "X" transmissions. Where many transmissions had a fourth gear added on as an afterthought, Ford's new transmission was designed with a fourth gear integrated into the gearset. Because it was based on the "X" transmissions, its gear ratios from 1-3 were the same with the fourth being 0.67:1. The transmission featured a split-torque application for third gear as well as a lockup in the torque converter. The XT-LOD was initially abandoned in 1966 but design began again in 1974 as a result of rising gas prices. The project was shelved with a design that lacked a damper in the torque converter but after the project was revisited a damper ultimately made its way into the final design. The transmission was introduced when Ford started to downsize its full size line in 1979. Initially called XT-LOD (Extension Lock-Up Overdrive) its name was changed when revisited in 1974 to FIOD (Ford Integrated Overdrive) and then to its final name in 1979, the Ford AOD transmission.

Applications:
 1980–1986 Ford LTD
 1980–1993 Ford Thunderbird
 1980–1993 Mercury Cougar
 1984–1993 Ford Mustang
 1980–1986 Mercury Marquis
 1983–1993 Ford Econoline
 1983–1991 Ford LTD Crown Victoria
 1983–1992 Mercury Grand Marquis
 1982–1993 Ford Bronco
 1981–1992 Lincoln Town Car
 1980–1987 Lincoln Continental
 1980–1983 Continental Mark VI
 1984–1985 Continental Mark VII
 1986–1992 Lincoln Mark VII
 1992 Ford Crown Victoria
 1980–1993 Ford F-Series

Gear ratios
 First: 2.47:1
 Second: 1.47:1
 Third: 1.00:1
 Overdrive: 0.67:1
 Reverse: 2.00:1

AODE
The AOD was redesigned with electronic controls in 1992, becoming the AOD-E.  It was mainly intended for the new Modular V8 at first, but it was also adapted to the old AOD bell-housing for vehicles still powered by pushrod engines. While the AOD and AOD-E are similar to each other (oil pans, casings, bell-housing, and internals), they are not interchangeable with each other because the AOD-E's shift points are controlled electronically from a combination of solenoids and the Powertrain Control Module (PCM) while the AOD's shift points are hydraulically controlled by a throttle valve rod.
 
Applications:
 1992–1994 Lincoln Town Car
 1992 and up     Ford F-Series trucks and E-Series vans
 1993–1994 Ford Crown Victoria
 1993–1994 Mercury Grand Marquis
 1994–1995 Ford Mustang

4R70W
A revised version of the AOD-E Transmission was released in 1993 with the Lincoln Mark VIII. Unlike the AOD-E, Reverse, 1st, and 2nd gear ratios in the 4R70-W are numerically higher, giving the transmission a better mechanical advantage and in turn, better take-off acceleration, better passing acceleration, slightly lower fuel consumption, and designed for better gearset strength; The 4th gear ratio in the 4R70-W is up 0.70:1 from 0.67:1. Although this may sound bad, fuel economy is slightly increased and downshifting is slightly decreased for less wear. On vehicles powered by the 5.4L V8, a stronger gearset is used than in normal duty 4R70Ws and Torque Converter stall speeds is also slightly lower because of the 5.4L’s increased low end torque opposed to the 4.6L. In 1998, due to durability concerns, the intermediate one-way roller clutch was replaced with a mechanical diode providing extra holding capacity and longer service.

While there is some speculation that the 70 can be multiplied by 10 to indicate the pound-feet of torque this transmission is capable of handling, including torque converter multiplication, (i.e. 700 lb-ft of torque), there is no reliable source indicating this. In fact a Ford document stated that the 2003 "Expedition's 4R70W transmission is rated to handle up to 506 pound-feet of torque, which provides a large performance cushion beyond the peak torque rating of Expedition's largest available engine." It is more plausible that the number indicates the torque handling capability in N-m, as 506 lb-ft converts to 686 N-m which could be rounded to 700 N-m. The "70" may also refer to the transmission's torque capacity after torque converter multiplication which occurs at low rpm's when the torque converter is more "elastic". 4R70W indicates 4 gears, Rear wheel drive and Wider gear ratio compared to the AODE.

The gear ratios are:
 First: 2.84 :1
 Second: 1.55 :1
 Third: 1.00 :1
 Overdrive: 0.70 :1
 Reverse: 2.32 :1

Applications:
 1993–1998 Lincoln Mark VIII
 1993–2003 Ford F-Series
 1994–1997 Ford Thunderbird
 1995–2004 Ford Crown Victoria
 1996–2001 Ford Explorer
 1993–2004 Lincoln Town Car
 1994–1997 Mercury Cougar
 1995–2004 Mercury Grand Marquis
 2003 Mercury Marauder
 1997–2004 Ford Expedition
 1997–2001 Mercury Mountaineer
 1996–2004 Ford Mustang
 2004–2005 Rover 75 V8

4R75W

In 2003, Ford revised the 4R70W transmission to include: A stronger ring gear that has 24 lugs (as opposed to 6) for the output shaft sensor to read off of, a revised torque converter, a revised front pump assembly, and a vehicle speed sensor (VSS) that complements the OSS to improve shift quality and efficiency. These improvements allowed the 4R75W to handle more power while being more efficient and economical.  While not used on all 2003 model year vehicles, the 4R75W/E transmissions eventually replaced the 4R70W/E. 

Newer transmissions that are referred to as 4R70E or 4R75E have modifications that complement Fords switching to throttle by wire. The PCM was given a more powerful microprocessor and Ford added a turbine speed sensor to the transmission.  This allows the PCM to know the speed of the input shaft after the torque converter which is used in combination with crankshaft speed to detect the amount of slipping going on in the torque converter.  This information provides PCM with the basis for fully electronic shift scheduling which limits "hunting" and fine-tunes shift speed and feel.  It lets the PCM know what the torque will be in the next gear so it can choose the shift points based on the vehicle's projected performance in the next gear.  Coupled with the electronic throttle strategy, the transmission computes the output torque required to maintain the vehicle speed, and chooses the correct gear and converter state accordingly.

Modification

The most practical modification for the 4R70W is the J-mod. It involves modifying the valve body separator plate and gaskets as well as changing or removing accumulator springs to alter the shift timing of the transmission.  While these modifications can be done to the 4R75W transmission, the results are not as dramatic, as some of the details of the J-Mod (bigger holes in the separator plate and gasket) were done to the transmission in its design.  These modifications are specified by one of the Ford engineers who designed the transmission. It offers faster engagement, quicker shifting, smoother operation, and increased service life. All parts can be bought at Ford dealers for less than $60 including the fluid.

A 20,000+ GVW cooler is highly recommended for all vehicles. Breakdown of the transmission fluid often results in "converter shudder" (feels like driving over rumble strips) where converter tries to maintain a steady slip rate during lock-up, but alternates between slipping and grabbing.  Frequent fluid changes, especially when used for towing, are the single best method to prevent shudder.  Shudder occurs because the torque converter never fully enters "lock-up", and ends up bouncing in and out of lock-up to slip.  This causes the engine to flare up and then down again as the clutch cannot hold back the power of the engine.

4R70W Usage
2002
4R70W used in all applications:
Ford F-Series
Ford Crown Victoria
Mercury Grand Marquis
Lincoln Town Car
Ford Mustang
Ford Expedition
Ford E-Series

2003
4R75W Used in:
 Ford Mustang (GT and Mach 1) 

4R70W usage in trucks:
 5.4 L V8  F-150, Ford E-Series, and Ford Expedition
 4.6 L V8 Ford E-Series Van, 4.2 L and 4.6 L  F-150

4R70W usage in cars:
 3.8 L V6 Ford Mustang
Ford Panther platform Cars: Ford Crown Victoria, Mercury Grand Marquis, Mercury Marauder and Lincoln Town Car

2004
4R75E used in:
 5.4 L 3 Valve V8  F-150

4R70E used in: 
4.6 L V8  F-150(except F-150 Heritage)

4R75W used in:
Mercury Marauder
Ford Police Interceptor
Ford Mustang (GT and Mach 1) 
5.4 L 2 Valve V8 Trucks Ford E-Series Van, and Ford Expedition
Rover 75 V8

4R70W used in all other applications:
 3.9 L V6 Ford Mustang 
 4.6 L V8 Ford E-Series 
 4.6 L V8 Ford Expedition 
 Ford Panther platform Cars: Ford Crown Victoria, Mercury Grand Marquis, and Lincoln Town Car
 4.2 L V6 and 4.6 L/5.4 L V8 Ford F-150 Heritage

2005
4R75E used in 5.4 L 2 Valve and 3 Valve Trucks:
 F-150 
Ford E-Series
Ford Expedition

4R70W used in: 
 F-150 Heritage (sold only in Mexico)

4R70E used in:
 4.6 L V8 Ford E-Series
 4.6 L V8 Ford Panther platform Cars: Ford Crown Victoria, Mercury Grand Marquis, and Lincoln Town Car
 4.6 L V8  Ford F-150 except F-150 Heritage (sold only in Mexico)

2006 to 2008
4R70W used in:
  Ford F-150 Heritage (sold only in Mexico)

4R75E used in all applications: 
 2006-2011 Ford Panther platform Cars: Ford Crown Victoria, Mercury Grand Marquis, and Lincoln Town Car.
2007-2008 4.2 L V6, 4.6 L V8, 2004-2008 5.4 L 3 Valve V8Ford F-Series except F-150 Heritage (sold only in Mexico)
2006 Ford Expedition
2006-2013 4.6 L V8, 5.4 L V8Ford E-Series

See also
 List of Ford transmissions

References

 LINCOLNSONLINE.COM

AOD